Partille Municipality (Partille kommun) is a municipality in Västra Götaland County in western Sweden. Its seat is located in Partille, which constitutes a part of the contiguously built-up Gothenburg urban area.

The municipality is by area one of the smallest in Sweden with only 59.35 km².

The parish Partille was made a rural municipality, when the first local government acts came into force in 1863. Territorially it has not been affected by the nationwide municipal reforms carried out during the 20th century. It has retained its area, but it has developed into a suburb of Gothenburg.

Geography
The municipality is subdivided into four geographical areas: Partille, Sävedalen, Jonsered and Öjersjö.

The area is a traditional Swedish woodland. Much of its industries has therefore a connection to the forest industry.

Localities
The western part of the municipality is part of the contiguous Gothenburg urban area. This then leads into Partille Centrum, which is the seat and the central part of the municipality.

Other localities are:
Jonsered
Kåhög
Öjersjö
Furulund, Partille

History
The area has been inhabited for more than a thousand years. Fifteen ancient monuments from that time remain.

Partille is located in a valley, between some mountains in a rocky terrain. Its name is believed to be derived from something similar to "Part haella" meaning "split rock". Another possible meaning could be "Port haella", the door in the mountain. The small river Säveån flows through the valley and intersects Partille. The name Säveån stems from the words säve, as in sävligt (leisurely, slow) and ån (the stream/creek), as it is a very slowly flowing little river. The river has been of great importance for Partille throughout its history. The fertile soil around it was used for agriculture and during the medieval ages a lot of farms were located there.

The oldest existing building in Partille is Partille Kyrka (Partille Church) which was built in the 13th century. The church, being placed in the current centre of Partille, indicates that the present centre has been the natural rendezvous and centre of the municipality ever since it was built. Being a Swedish, very old-fashioned, Partille Kyrka has no bell tower, as a complement a separate belfry was built in 1652.

It is also an excellent place for fishing. Records from the 16th century show that government officials fished here at the time. As is still the case today, the most popular fish were salmon and trout.

Apart from agriculture and forestry transportations has been a very important field of business. The manager of the East India Company, David af Sanderberg, built Partille Herrgård (manor) between 1770 and 1780, today this manor serves a landmark for everyone who passes through the municipality. Later, during the 19th century, Sweden's first industrial society developed in Jonsered. The Scotsmen William Gibson and Alexander Keiller opened a factory for production of sail- and tent cloth.  Sweden's first terrace-houses in classical English style was also built there. Nowadays Jonsered is still classified as a national interest due to its well preserved cultural environment.

Economy
Industries which are based in Partille include: Soft Touch AB (Personal Protective Equipment), Triumfglass (ice cream), Swisslog, Ragn Sells.

Apart from Partille Manor, the main key feature of Partille is the shopping mall Allum. In 1999 Partille municipality initiated a cooperation with the construction company Sten & Ström Sverige. The aim of this co-operation was to unify the two parts of the municipality, each on the north/south of the highway E20. The construction of Allum began on 3 February 2004 and was completed on 9 April 2006. The name "Allum" comes from the old Swedish word for "alla" (everyone), the name thus mean "åt alla" (for everyone) or "till alla" (to everyone). The mall has created roughly 650 new jobs and includes around 100 stores.

Sports

The following sports clubs are located in Partille:

 Partille IF
 IK Sävehof
 
 Jonsereds IF
 Partille Badminton

Partille Cup
The handball tournament Partille Cup was first launched in Partille in 1963, it was then played at Vallhamra Idrottsplats Vallhamra sports field. As the tournament grew in size it was partially, and later entirely moved to Gothenburg, where it is now played. Partille Cup is the world's greatest handball tournament for youths, in 2010 the tournament featured 1035 teams from 46 different countries. The tournament is arranged annually during the first week of July by the Swedish handball club IK Sävehof from Partille.

Education
Partille has several elementary schools including:

 Casa Montessori
Björndammens Skola 
Furulunds Skola 
Lexby Skola 
Jonsereds Skola 
Lillegårdsskolan 
Oxeledsskolan 
Skulltorps Skola
Ugglums Skola
Vallhamra Skola
Öjersjö Brunn 
Öjersjö Storegård
Stadsparksskolan

The municipality then offers a higher education at Porthälla Gymnasium (high school).

Twin cities
 Chrudim—Czech Republic

References

External links

Partille Municipality - Official site
Spartacus RUFC - Rugby club in Partille

Municipalities of Västra Götaland County
Municipal seats of Västra Götaland County
Swedish municipal seats
Metropolitan Gothenburg
Gothenburg and Bohus